George Washington Community High School is a public school located in Indianapolis, Indiana, United States, serving grades 9–12.

About
The school originally opened in 1927 as a traditional high school in the Haughville neighborhood of Indianapolis. It ceased operations as a high school in 1995 due to waning enrollment within IPS, but was re-established in 2000 in its current form. The school is operated by the Indianapolis Public Schools system. Enrollment is approximately 575 students. It is referred to as Indianapolis Washington by the IHSAA.

Athletics
George Washington Community High School's athletic teams are named the Continentals. The Continentals have won two Indiana High School Athletic Association State Championships in boys' basketball (1964–65 and 1968–69).

Notable alumni
 Steve Downing – former member of the Boston Celtics
 Darrin Fitzgerald – former Butler basketball player
 Jeff James – former professional baseball player, letterman at Indiana State University
 Billy Keller – former professional basketball player; played for Purdue and the Indiana Pacers during their time in the American Basketball Association
 George McGinnis – Member of the Naismith Basketball Hall of Fame; former member of the Indiana Pacers, Philadelphia 76ers, and Indiana Hoosiers
 Marv Winkler – former member of the Indiana Pacers

See also
 List of high schools in Indiana

References

External links
George Washington Community High School website

Schools in Indianapolis
Public high schools in Indiana
Educational institutions established in 1927
Public middle schools in Indiana
1927 establishments in Indiana